Shila Nang Dong, also known as M Nang Dong (born 6 October 1954) is a Burmese politician who currently serves as an Amyotha Hluttaw MP for Kachin State No. 2 constituency. She is a member of the National League for Democracy.

Early life and education
Shila Nang Dong was born on 6 October 1954 in Kukai, Shan State, Myanmar. She is an ethnic Kachin and Shan. She graduated with B.Ed. from Yangon Institute of Education in 1977, followed by an M.Phil(Eng) and M.A (Eng) from Mandalay University.

Political career
She is a member of the National League for Democracy. In the 2015 Myanmar general election, she was elected as an Amyotha Hluttaw MP, winning a majority of 49,882 votes and elected representative from the Kachin State No. 2 constituency.

References 

1954 births
National League for Democracy politicians
People from Shan State
Burmese people of Karen descent
Burmese people of Shan descent
Living people
Mandalay University alumni
University of Yangon alumni